Nothing but the Night is a 1973 British horror film directed by Peter Sasdy and starring Christopher Lee and Peter Cushing.

Synopsis
Three wealthy trustees of the Van Traylen fund, which supports a school for orphans on the Scottish island of Bala, are murdered, though their deaths are staged as suicide or accident.  Three other trustees are on a bus carrying children from the school when the driver suddenly catches on fire, but he is the only one to die.  One of the girls on the bus, Mary Valley (Gwyneth Strong), is taken to a London hospital, where she has strange seizures.  A young psychiatrist (Keith Barron) and a tabloid journalist (Georgia Brown) interview the girl's mother (Diana Dors), hoping to enlist the aid of the hospital's senior member, Sir Mark Ashley (Peter Cushing).  When the psychiatrist is killed, Ashley enlists the aid of friend and police inspector Colonel Charles Bingham (Christopher Lee).  The two take their investigation to Bala.  In the meantime, Mary Valley's mother also journeys to Bala, hoping to find her daughter, although she has come under suspicion for the murders of the trustees and an explosion on a boat near the island that apparently kills several others of the school's trustees.  Ashley and Bingham eventually uncover the sinister truth behind the murders.

Cast
 Christopher Lee as Col. Charles Bingham
 Peter Cushing as Sir Mark Ashley
 Diana Dors as Anna Harb
 Georgia Brown as Joan Foster
 Keith Barron as Dr. Haynes
 Gwyneth Strong as Mary Valley
 Fulton Mackay as Cameron
 John Robinson as Lord Fawnlee
 Morris Perry as Dr. Yeats
 Michael Gambon as Insp. Grant
 Duncan Lamont as Dr. Knight
 Shelagh Fraser as Mrs. Alison
 Kathleen Byron as Dr. Rose
 Andrew McCulloch as Malcolm
 Michael Brennan as Deck Hand

Production
A commercial failure, the film was the only production of Charlemagne Films, cofounded by Christopher Lee and Anthony Nelson Keys.

It was one of a number of horror films featuring Diana Dors.

Reception
Time Out London gave Nothing but the Night a negative review. The magazine stated "Something has obviously come fatally adrift with the film...The script seems mostly at fault, and often the acting is just that little bit over-emphatic, which doesn't help." Peter Nicholls also criticized the film: "Lacklustre performances all around in this confused, badly developed, laborious movie, especially from the children who are so important to the plot."

References

Sources
 The Peter Cushing Companion by David Miller
 Christopher Lee and Peter Cushing and Horror Cinema, by Mark A. Miller

External links
 
 
 
 Nothing but the Night at Turner Classic Movies

British horror films
Films directed by Peter Sasdy
Films shot at Pinewood Studios
Films scored by Malcolm Williamson
Films set in Scotland
Films set on fictional islands
1970s English-language films
1970s British films